Dear Mr. Watterson is a 2013 American documentary film directed by Joel Allen Schroeder, produced by Christopher Browne and Matt McUsic, with Andrew P. Waruszewski as the cinematographer. The film follows the career of Bill Watterson, the author of the comic strip Calvin and Hobbes, and the influence of both the author and the comic strip on the world.

Watterson ended the strip on December 31, 1995, and since then has avoided the public eye.

History
The origin of Dear Mr. Watterson came from Schroeder wanting to understand the cultural impact of Bill Watterson's decade-long comic strip, so he began with a series of fan interviews in December 2007.

Dear Mr. Watterson launched its first Kickstarter campaign on December 15, 2009, ending March 15, 2010. The Kickstarter raised more than 200% of the goal of $12,000. After the first fundraising campaign, the filmmakers interviewed Berkeley Breathed, Lee Salem, Stephan Pastis, Jef Mallett, Dave Kellett, Charles Solomon, Seth Green, Keith Knight, Jenny Robb, Tony Cochran, Andrew Farago (Cartoon Art Museum), Joe Wos (Toonseum), Jean Schulz, Jan Eliot, Bill Amend, and more. In addition, a second Kickstarter campaign was launched in order to fund the finishing of the project. The campaign was successfully funded July 14, 2012.

On November 21, 2012, Schroeder reported to the Kickstarter backers that they had completed the Martini Shot. In late December 2012, the crew shipped nearly 200 posters to backers of their Kickstarter all over the world. The filmmakers submitted their documentary to festivals around the world, and on March 1, 2013 they announced that Dear Mr. Watterson had been accepted into the 37th Annual Cleveland International Film Festival.

Release
Dear Mr. Watterson had its premiere at the Cleveland International Film Festival on April 9, 2013. The film had a limited release and a video on demand release on November 15, 2013.

Influences and impact
The director Joel Schroeder recalls: 

The film began with Schroeder interviewing fans of the strip to better understand the cultural impact it had. The filmmaker did not seek to interview Watterson knowing his reclusiveness (the artist was invited to the premiere, but watched the DVD instead).

In an interview with NPR's Weekend Edition, Schroeder explained that Watterson's final cartoon exemplified the strip's enduring appeal. Said Schroeder, describing the panel: "It's a fresh layer of snow and Calvin and Hobbes are out with the toboggan, and Calvin looks to Hobbes and says, 'It's a magical world, old buddy ... let's go exploring.' And those last words are just, I think, a challenge to all of us to make sure that we have that curiosity. And words, I think words to live by."

The film was later parodied in an episode of Documentary Now! as "Searching for Mr. Larson", where Fred Armisen portrays a narcissistic filmmaker attempting to find The Far Side creator Gary Larson.

References

External links 

2013 films
2013 documentary films
Calvin and Hobbes
Kickstarter-funded documentaries
Films shot in Ohio
Documentary films about fandom
2010s English-language films